The 1983–84 Princeton Tigers men's basketball team represented Princeton University in intercollegiate college basketball during the 1983–84 NCAA Division I men's basketball season. The head coach was Pete Carril and the team captains was Bill Ryan. The team played its home games in the Jadwin Gymnasium on the University campus in Princeton, New Jersey.  The team was the champion of the Ivy League, which earned it an invitation to the 53-team 1984 NCAA Division I men's basketball tournament.

The team posted an 18–10 overall record and a 10–4 conference record. During the season, the team faced NCAA basketball tournament entrants Northeastern and eventual champion Houston in December tournaments. In a 1984 NCAA Division I men's basketball tournament preliminary round game on March 13 at The Palestra in Philadelphia, Pennsylvania, the team defeated San Diego Toreros 65–56. Then, in the March 15 West Regional first-round game at the Huntsman Center in Salt Lake City, Utah against the UNLV Runnin' Rebels, it lost by a 68–56 margin.

The team was led by first team All-Ivy League selections Kevin Mullin and Bill Ryan.  That season, Ryan led the Ivy League in assists for the second time. Mullin was drafted by the Boston Celtics in the 1984 NBA Draft with the 93rd overall selection in the fourth round, while Ryan was selected by the New Jersey Nets with the 200th selection in the ninth round.

The team was the national statistical champion in scoring defense with an average of 52.0 points allowed.

References

Princeton Tigers men's basketball seasons
Princeton Tigers
Princeton
Princeton
Princeton